Animal House is the second and final studio album by American rapper Angie Martinez. It was released by Elektra Records on August 20, 2002 in the United States. The album was co-written by Sacario and features guest appearances by Missy Elliott, Fat Joe, Petey Pablo, Sacario, Kelis, N.O.R.E and Tony Sunshine. Animal House sold 62,000 units in its first week of release and debuted at number six on Billboards Top R&B/Hip-Hop Albums and number 11 on the Billboard 200 chart. Lead single "If I Could Go" featuring Sacario and Lil Mo became Martinez's biggest-selling single to date.

Critical reception 

AllMusic editor Michael Gallucci rated the album one and a half a stars out of five. He wrote: "Martinez's day job is as a DJ at a N.Y.C. hip-hop station, and her second album is reason enough for her not to quit. Devoid of style and anything to say, Martinez merely recites her rhymes over flaccid beats, hoping to hook on to something. She falls into nearly all of hip-hop's traps (thankfully, she keeps Animal House at a reasonable 45 minutes): overwrought R&B choruses, lame-ass skits, and "featured" turns by guest-rapping B-listers."

Track listing

Charts

References 

Angie Martinez albums
2002 albums
Albums produced by Scott Storch
Albums produced by Buckwild
Albums produced by Cool & Dre
Albums produced by Rick Rock
Albums produced by Ski Beatz
Elektra Records albums